John Cowperthwaite may refer to:

John James Cowperthwaite, British civil servant and the financial secretary of Hong Kong from 1961 to 1971
John Cowperthwaite, British motor vehicle designer, designer of the JC Midge